Calf Robe Mountain is a  mountain summit located in Glacier National Park in the U.S. state of Montana. It is situated on the Continental Divide in the Lewis Range, and can be seen from Highway 2 midway between Marias Pass and East Glacier Park. The summit is set on the border shared by Flathead County and Glacier County. Topographic relief is significant as the east aspect rises  in one mile. The immediate area between the mountain and highway is known for its aspen and beaver dams.

Etymology 
The mountain's name, which commemorates Calf Robe, member of the Blackfeet, was submitted by the National Park Service in 1939, and officially adopted in 1940 by the United States Board on Geographic Names. Legend has it that Calf Robe supposedly had a weird experience with a grizzly bear about 1870. Calf Robe was deserted by his fellow warriors in enemy country and left to die; but he was soon rescued by a grizzly bear, which brought him food and carried him to help. The grizzly only asked a favor in return: that Calf Robe would never kill a bear in winter, which is why the Piikani will never kill a hibernating bear. The Blackfeet name for Calf Robe is "Onistai'yi".

Geology 

Like other mountains in Glacier National Park, Calf Robe Mountain is composed of sedimentary rock laid down during the Precambrian to Jurassic periods.

Climate 
According to the Köppen climate classification system, Calf Robe Mountain is located in an alpine subarctic climate zone with long, cold, snowy winters, and cool to warm summers. Winter temperatures can drop below −10 °F with wind chill factors below −30 °F. Due to its altitude, it receives precipitation all year, as snow in winter, and as thunderstorms in summer. Precipitation runoff from the east side of the mountain drains into tributaries of the Two Medicine River, and the west side drains to Ole Creek, which is a tributary of Middle Fork Flathead River.

See also
 Mountains and mountain ranges of Glacier National Park (U.S.)
 Geology of the Rocky Mountains

References

External links 
 Weather forecast: Calf Robe Mountain

Mountains of Glacier County, Montana
Mountains of Flathead County, Montana
Mountains of Glacier National Park (U.S.)
Lewis Range
Mountains of Montana
North American 2000 m summits